Baganwala is a village in Jind district of the state of Haryana, India. As of 2009, it consisted of 62 households, with a total population of 424. It is located 4 km from Ramrai village on a link road that connects to State Highway 12 from Jind to Hansi. The village has a co-educational school which was established in 1972. As of 2013, it had 42 students. The medium of instruction is Hindi.

References

External links
Village Maps of India. Google Map of Baganwala, Jind

Villages in Jind district